Drew Mitchell Ellis (born December 1, 1995) is an American professional baseball third baseman who is a free agent. He has previously played in Major League Baseball (MLB) for the Arizona Diamondbacks and Seattle Mariners.

Early life and amateur career
Ellis is from Jeffersonville, Indiana. Ellis’ father, Derek played college baseball at Indiana State University. Ellis played in the 2008 Little League World Series. He attended Jeffersonville High School, where he played baseball and basketball and the University of Louisville, where he played college baseball for the Louisville Cardinals. With Louisville, he was the backup third baseman behind Blake Tiberi, but was moved into left field to get into the lineup. As a sophomore, Ellis returned to playing as a third baseman.

Professional career

Arizona Diamondbacks
The Arizona Diamondbacks selected Ellis in the second round, with the 44th overall selection, of the 2017 MLB draft. Ellis signed with the Diamondbacks, receiving a $1,560,100 signing bonus. He made his professional debut and spent the 2017 season with the Hillsboro Hops of the Low-A Northwest League where he posted a .227 batting average with eight home runs and 23 RBIs. Ellis spent the 2018 season with the Visalia Rawhide of the High-A California League, slashing .246/.331/.429 with 15 home runs and 71 RBIs in 120 games.

Ellis spent the 2019 season with the Jackson Generals of the Double-A Southern League. Over 118 games, he hit .234/.344/.406 with 14 home runs and 63 RBIs. Ellis did not play in a game in 2020 due to the cancellation of the minor league season because of the COVID-19 pandemic. He opened the 2021 season with the Triple-A Reno Aces.

On July 30, 2021, Arizona selected his contract and promoted him to the active roster. He made his MLB debut that night. He made 28 appearances for the big league club, hitting .130/.277/.203 with one home run and 5 RBI.

In 2022, Ellis got into 6 games for the Diamondbacks, going 2-for-13 with a walk in 14 plate appearances. The Diamondbacks designated Ellis for assignment on June 12, 2022.

Seattle Mariners
On June 16, 2022, the Seattle Mariners claimed Ellis off of waivers. Ellis made one major league appearance for Seattle, going 1-for-3 with a strikeout. The bulk of his stint with the club was spent with the Triple-A Tacoma Rainiers, where he played in 70 games and hit .231/.346/.488 with 15 home runs, 39 RBI, and 4 stolen bases. On November 3, 2022, he was removed from the 40-man roster and sent outright to Triple-A. He was invited to Spring Training with Seattle in 2023, but was released prior to the start of the season on March 17, 2023.

References

External links

1995 births
Living people
People from Jeffersonville, Indiana
Baseball players from Indiana
Major League Baseball third basemen
Arizona Diamondbacks players
Seattle Mariners players
Louisville Cardinals baseball players
Hillsboro Hops players
Visalia Rawhide players
Salt River Rafters players
Jackson Generals (Southern League) players
Reno Aces players
Tacoma Rainiers players
Rochester Honkers players